The Battle of Crevola was fought in the spring of 1487, between a marauding Swiss army from the Valais and Lucerne and troops from the Duchy of Milan, for the supremacy of the Val d'Ossola (Eschental) .

Prelude
In the year 1487, for unknown but petty reasons, Bishop Jost von Silenen entered into dispute with the Count of Arona, whose seignory was the Duke of Milan. The Knight Albin von Silenen, brother of Bishop Jost von Silenen, was appointed the leader of this military expedition. As soon as the Simplon pass was passable, the Swiss crossed into the Val d'Ossola; here they were joined by another 1,000 Swiss, who were returning from Savoy.

Battle
The Swiss besieged Domo, occupied the castle of Mattarella, and terribly ravaged the impoverished valleys. The Duke of Milan, however, ordered the Ossolani to keep the Swiss inactive with false peace negotiations, until the duchy could dispatch a sufficient army. Once the troops were assembled, they were split into three separate corps under the command of Renato Trivulzio, Count Borromeo, and Gio. Pietro Bergamino. The Swiss were once again marauding in the villages of the Valle Vigezzo, when they were assaulted by the Milanese troops from three sides. The Swiss formed a square and a murderous combat ensued, in which the Swiss lost 800-1000 men and all their baggage. The rest of the Swiss troops were allowed to flee into the impassable mountain range. The corpses of the dead Swiss were desecrated by the local peasants: the heads and fingers were cut off, the heads put on pikes and the fingers used as hat decorations.

Aftermath
Further bloodshed was however prevented, when a legation of the Old Swiss Confederacy negotiated a peace treaty with the Duchy of Milan on July 23, 1487. At ponte di Crevola, the Ossolani dedicated an Oratory to Martyr Saint Vitalis in honour and remembrance of this victorious battle.

See also
Battles of the Old Swiss Confederacy

References

Crevola
Crevola 1487
1487 in Europe
1480s in the Holy Roman Empire
15th century in Italy
15th century in the Old Swiss Confederacy
Conflicts in 1487